Graham Jackson may refer to:
 Graham Jackson (British conductor)  (1967–2012), British conductor
 Graham W. Jackson Sr. (1903–1983), American theatre organist, pianist and choral conductor
 Jack Jackson (businessman) (W. Graham Jackson), co-founder of Pep Boys
 Graham Jackson (novelist), see Jane Loop